Senator Cocke may refer to:

John Alexander Cocke (1772–1854), Tennessee State Senate
Richard I. Cocke (1820–1873), Virginia State Senate
William Cocke (1748–1828), U.S. Senator from Tennessee from 1796 to 1797

See also
Townsend D. Cock (1838–1913), New York State Senate